Bullard Mountain is a  mountain summit located in the Boundary Ranges, in the U.S. state of Alaska. Bullard Mountain is often seen and photographed with Mount Wrather, a  summit  to the north because they are together in the background behind Mendenhall Lake, a popular tourist and recreation area. Although modest in elevation, relief is significant since the mountain rises from this nearly sea-level lake in less than two miles. Precipitation runoff from the mountain drains into the lake via Nugget Creek and Nugget Falls. Bullard Mountain is named for Benjamin Bullard (1848-1933), a mining engineer who, in 1907, began mining on Nugget Creek where he later built a hydroelectric power plant.

Climate

Based on the Köppen climate classification, Bullard Mountain is located in a subarctic climate zone with cold, snowy winters, and mild summers. Temperatures can drop below −20 °C with wind chill factors below −30 °C. This climate supports the Mendenhall Glacier to the mountain's west. The month of July offers the most favorable weather for viewing and climbing this peak.

See also

List of mountain peaks of Alaska
Geography of Alaska

References

Gallery

External links
 Weather forecast: Bullard Mountain
 Bullard Mountain climbing blog with photos
 Nugget Towers and Bullard Mountain: Flickr photo

Mountains of Alaska
Mountains of Juneau, Alaska
Boundary Ranges
North American 1000 m summits